The Daryl Chase Fine Arts Center is a multi-venue visual and performing arts complex on the campus of Utah State University. It is named for Daryl Chase, the tenth president of USU, who served from 1954 to 1968.

It houses performance venues such as the Kent Concert Hall, the Morgan Theatre, the Tippetts Balcony, the Black Box Studio Theatre, and the Tippetts Exhibit Hall. It also serves as the home of the Departments of Art, Music, Theatre, and Landscape Architecture and Environmental Planning at USU, and contains numerous practice rooms, lecture halls, and offices.

Along with the Manon Caine Russell Kathryn Caine Wanlass Performance Hall, the Nora Eccles Harrison Museum of Art, and the Caine Lyric Theatre, the Chase Fine Arts Center anchors the Fine Arts Complex at USU.

Performance venues

Kent Concert Hall
The 2,168-seat Kent Concert Hall is the anchor and largest venue of the Chase Fine Arts Center, serving primarily as a performance space for orchestras, large bands, and choirs. As it is the largest auditorium on the campus of Utah State University, as well as the entire Cache Valley, it serves national and international touring music, dance, and theater productions in addition to community events and university tenants such as Craig Jessop's American Festival Chorus. The Kent opened with the Chase Fine Arts Center in 1967. The concert hall also houses the largest pipe organ in Logan, built in 1973 by the Holtkamp organ company of Cleveland, Ohio. The instrument comprises 43 stops, 56 ranks and 3,027 individual pipes. It is installed on the west wall of the concert hall in Holtkamp's signature functional, modern design aesthetic.

During two mornings each week, the orchestra section of the Kent Concert Hall serves as the classroom for the gigantic Creative Arts course taken as a general education requirement by nearly every USU student. The course is taught by opera singer Michael Ballam.

Other performance venues
The 670-seat Morgan Theatre is a thrust theatre, and is home to smaller, more intimate theatrical productions, including the majority of productions put on by the Theatre Department at USU.

The Chase Fine Arts Center also houses a smaller venue called the Tippets Balcony, a 150-seat glass-enclosed recital space, and a Black Box Studio Theatre, which can seat up to 90 for extremely intimate productions.

Visual art museums and galleries

Other visual arts spaces
The Chase Fine Arts Center houses the Tippets Exhibit Hall, which is adjacent to the Tippets Balcony.

Educational amenities
In addition to the exhibition and performance space, the Chase Fine Arts Center contains numerous amenities for student use, including  of ceramics space. Ceramics students utilize seven kilns of various shapes and sizes, as well as individual studio spaces and studio equipment for students. Graphic design students and others interested in multimedia have use of the Fine Arts-Visual computer lab with design and video editing software and equipment. Photography labs and individual music practice rooms may also be rented out by students.

References

External links
 Chase Fine Arts Center official site
  Utah Center for Architecture - Burtch W. Beall Jr

Concert halls in Utah
Arts centers in Utah
Performing arts centers in Utah
Utah State University
Buildings and structures in Logan, Utah
Tourist attractions in Cache County, Utah
University and college arts centers in the United States
Event venues established in 1967
1967 establishments in Utah